Shiloh School is a historic one-room school building located near Kilmarnock, Northumberland County, Virginia.  It was built in 1906, and is a one-story, three bay, simple frame building measuring 20 feet by 34 feet. It sits on a brick foundation and has a standing seam metal gable roof. Jessie Ball duPont (1884-1970) taught at the school in 1906–1907. It was used as a schoolhouse until 1929, and subsequently used for farm storage.

It was listed on the National Register of Historic Places in 1992.

References

One-room schoolhouses in Virginia
School buildings on the National Register of Historic Places in Virginia
School buildings completed in 1906
Buildings and structures in Northumberland County, Virginia
National Register of Historic Places in Northumberland County, Virginia
1906 establishments in Virginia